Marriage For Convenience is a 1919 silent film drama directed by Sidney Olcott and starring Catherine Calvert.

Prints survive of this feature the BFI National Archive, London, the Library of Congress and George Eastman House Motion Picture Collection.

Cast
Catherine Calvert - Natalie Rand
Ann May - Barbara Rand
George Majeroni - Oliver Landis
Henry Sedley - Howard Pollard
Blanche Davenport - Mrs. Raleigh Rand
Edmund Burns - Ned Gardiner (*as Edward Burns)
Sadie Leonard - Mrs. Daniel Chester
George Pauncefort - Dick Stanton
Cesare Gravina - Lazzare (*as Caesar Gravina)
Edward Slow - Negro Servant

References

External links
 

 Marriage for Convenience website dedicated to Sidney Olcott

1919 films
American silent feature films
Films directed by Sidney Olcott
1919 drama films
American black-and-white films
Silent American drama films
1910s American films